The Log Cabin Village is a recreation of a 19th-century village that shows how life was in 19th-century Texas. The site features costumed actors and historic buildings. Log Cabin Village is devoted to the preservation of Texas history.

History
The cabins in the village date to the middle of the 1800s. They were moved to the village from areas in Texas: and the cabins were restored. The land for the village was donated to the city of Fort Worth, Texas and the village began to admit guests in 1966.

The site features a realistic blacksmith building, a schoolhouse, a gristmill etc. Costumed actors speak with visitors and demonstrate skills from the 19th century.

Awards
2019 Texas Star Award - for contributions to preserving Texas history

Bibliography
Log Cabin Village: A History and Guide by Jordan-Bychkov, Terry G.

References

External links
Log Cabin Village
List of museums in North Texas

Museums established in 1966
Museums in Fort Worth, Texas
Natural history museums in Texas
History museums in Texas
European-American museums
Blacksmith shops
Rural history museums in the United States